Rosemount Recreation Football Club (commonly known as Rosemount Rec) is a Northern Irish football club from Greyabbey playing in Division 1B of the Northern Amateur Football League (NAFL). The 2011/2012 season saw the club celebrating 100 years of organised football in Greyabbey. The club finished 1st in Division 2A of the NAFL for the 2016/17 season, which saw them in intermediate football for the first time.
In the 2017/18 season, the 2nd team won division 3D of the amateur league, being promoted to 3C, celebrating two consecutive promotions.

In the 2002/03 season, the club completed a treble of trophies, winning the Down Area Winter Football League, Sittlington Cup and Billy Allen Memorial Shield.

The 2012/13 season was also a season of great success, with the club winning Division 2B of the Northern Amateur Football League and the Cochrane Corry Cup.

In the club's last season in the Down Area Winter Football league (2009/10), before joining the amateur league the next season, the club won a double, lifting the Sittlington Cup and the Down Area Winter Football League premier division.

The club fields 2 teams, The First Team plays in division 1B of the Northern Amateur Football League, and the 2nd team plays in division 3c.

The club reached the Junior Cup final in the 2014/15 season for the first time in their history, although they lost 3-1 to Harryville Homers.

In 2017, the club made history, winning an Irish cup game for the first time in their history, beating St. Lukes FC in Greyabbey.

The club is currently managed by Lee Cathcart, who previously managed Greenwell Star FC and Short Brothers. He managed his first game on 2 December 2017, in a 5-1 home victory over Groomsport F.C.

In the 2019/20 season, Rosemount celebrated another league title, winning division 1C, however, promotion was left in doubt due to the Amateur League voiding the season due to the coronavirus pandemic, eventually, however, Rosemount were confirmed to be promoted and be playing in 1B for season 2020/21

In 2021/22, Rosemount secured back-to-back league titles and in turn back-to-back promotions, with the club reaching 1A, it is the highest level the club has ever played at.

2017/18

2018/19
In the 2018/19 season, led by Cathcart, Rosemount made more history by becoming the first team from 1C in the amateur league to make it to the 5th round of the Irish cup, drawing Glenavon away from home, one of the biggest and best clubs in Northern Ireland at the time, Rosemount went on to lose 5-0, but Glenavon players and officials praised the Rosemount players for their attitude and effort, Rosemount had a few chances of their own including a corner cleared off the line, Rosemounts fans were also praised for the support they gave to the Greyabbey club, the same season they made it to the semi finals of the Border cup, losing to the previous season's champions Crumlin Star in extra time, Rosemount also made it to the clarence cup final against East Belfast, where they lost 2-1 after extra time due to a very poor refereeing decision, despite Rosemounts fantastic cup form, they went into the new year in the bottom half of the league, picking up just 3 wins from their first 9 games, drawing 2 and losing 4.

2019-20
They have just secured promotion and won the 1C league title by winning their last fixture against a strong Saintfield side. Rosemount were much improved in the league this season after finishing in a disappointing 6th place in 2018/19, Rosemount looked very impressive early season, beating Suffolk 3-1 in the first game of the season, and also a memorable comeback away at Woodvale, 3-0 down at half time, before winning 4-3. The club will now take a well deserved rest and get ready to play their games next season at the highest level Rosemount have ever played at. Retaining the squad and adding a few will see the club push for another promotion in 1B.

First Team Squad 2019-29

Club Officials 
Chairman: Trevor Mckay 
Secretary: Gary Bailie 
Treasurer: Rodney Bailie 
1st team Manager: Lee Cathcart 
1st team Assistant: Mark Cathcart 
1st team Coach: Andrew Palmer 
1st team Coach: Darren Ireland 
1st team Kit man : Christopher Eve 
Club Captain: Ryan Stewart 
2nd team Manager: Scott Ritchie
2nd team assistant: Willy McIlroy 
1ST TEAM GOALKEEPER COACH KURTIS BROWNE

Club honors - (1983-Present) 
Down Area Winter Football league (3), 
-2001/02, 2002/03, 2007/08
Billy Allen Memorial Shield (5), 
-2002/03, 2003/04, 2007/08, 2008/09, 2009/10
Sittlington Cup (5), 
-1995/96, 2002/03, 2005/06, 2007/08, 2009/10
 Northern Amateur Football League Division 2C
-2010/11
Northern Amateur Football League Division 2B
-2012/13
Cochrane Corry Cup
-2012/13
Champions of Down
-1983, 1984, 2014
Northern Amateur Football League Division 2A
-2016/17
IFA Junior Cup
Runners up: 2014/15, 2015/16

Northern Amateur Football League Division 1C
-2019/20
Northern Amateur Football League Division 1B
-2021/22

In 2011 Rosemount Rec released "A Clutch Of Memories", a book written by the Newtownards Chronicle journalist Dennis S. Nash, which covers the history of the club.

The club has a few rivals; Ballywalter, (Division 1B) and Kircubbin (Division 2A) but the club's biggest rivals are Portavogie Rangers (Division 2A)

References

External links
 nifootball.co.uk - (For fixtures, results and tables of all Northern Ireland amateur football leagues)
 Official website of the Northern Amateur Football League

Association football clubs in Northern Ireland
Northern Amateur Football League clubs